Brooklyn Center is a first-ring suburban city in Hennepin County, Minnesota, United States in the Minneapolis–Saint Paul metropolitan area. In 1911, the area became a village formed from parts of Brooklyn Township and Crystal Lake Township. In 1966, Brooklyn Center became a charter city. The city has commercial and industrial development. The majority of land use is single-family homes. The population was 33,782 at the 2020 census, and the city has become the most ethnically diverse community in the state.

History
Pioneers organized town governments for Brooklyn Township and Crystal Lake Township when Minnesota became a state in 1858. Osseo Road was a main thoroughfare that brought settlers to an area centered around their school, post office, store, meeting hall, and Baptist and Methodist churches. That location thrived as a market gardening community. It abutted the encroaching development of Minneapolis to the south.

Steps were taken to protect the area from annexation by Minneapolis and to retain "simpler public business methods, and extra police protection" by incorporation. The Hennepin County Board of Commissioners accepted a petition to incorporate the Village of Brooklyn Center on January 16, 1911. An election followed, the boundaries were set, and documents filed with the state on February 18, 1911. P.W. Reidhead was the first president. The population was 500.

By 1940, the village saw a need for more organized planning to deal with issues such as sewage and traffic. In 1942, a Planning Commission was established. Farmers were selling their valuable land to housing developers. The decade saw unprecedented population growth, reaching 4,000 by 1950. Brookdale, a new shopping concept by Dayton’s, was constructed in 1960 when the population had grown to over 24,000.  In 1963, even more new opportunities for commercial development were presented with the estate of Earle Brown, deceased, the heir of Captain John Martin who had been one of the wealthiest men in Minneapolis.

Earle Brown Heritage Center, was the former Cap Martin country estate, built in 1878 and willed to his grandson Earle Brown in 1901. The buildings included the family home, office and garage, housing for the workers, a pump house, multiple barns, a hippodrome, an antique carriage collection, and a restored lumber bunkhouse and cook shanty. It is now a historic site in Brooklyn Center owned by the city and developed into a conference and event center. 
  
Mound Cemetery of Brooklyn Center has been owned and managed by a not-for-profit organization since 1862. Its mission is to provide cemetery and perpetual care services to the public, and to preserve the historical burial grounds of the founding families of Brooklyn Township.

The Brooklyn Historical Society, is a 501(c3) nonprofit all-volunteer organization founded in 1970. Its mission is to research, preserve, and provide access to historical information about Brooklyn Township – yesterday, today, and tomorrow. The Society has historical displays at the city halls of Brooklyn Center and Brooklyn Park, and the Earle Brown Heritage Center. Its facility is in Brooklyn Park.

Geography
All of Brooklyn Center is in the Upper Mississippi Watershed Basin. The Mississippi River is the eastern boundary of the city and is part of the Mississippi National River and Recreation Area of Minnesota. The North Mississippi Regional Park, at 5700 Lyndale Avenue North, is managed by Three Rivers Park District Board, on which Brooklyn Center is represented in District 3.

Southwestern Brooklyn Center includes Upper Twin Lake (117 acres) and connects to a chain of lakes that discharge into Shingle Creek, which discharges into the Mississippi River. Shingle Creek also runs through Palmer Lake. The city is a member of Shingle Creek and West Mississippi Watershed Management Commission, which manages the lakes, streams, and wetlands in this area. Palmer Lake Park is a natural environmental preserve of lake and marsh habitat on over 200 acres.

All of Brooklyn Center is in the state's Deciduous Forest Biome. The Plant Hardiness Zone is 4B, with an average minimum extreme temperature of -25 to -20 Fahrenheit. The city has developed and maintains 26 parks and a 20-mile trail system. The majority of land use is single-family homes. The historical route, Osseo Road, was renamed Brooklyn Boulevard by both Brooklyn Center and Brooklyn Park in 1969. Interstates 94 and 694 and Minnesota State Highways 100 and 252 are four of the main routes in Brooklyn Center.

Demographics

2010 census
As of the census of 2010, 30,104 people, 10,756 households, and 7,010 families resided in the city. The racial makeup of the city was 49.1% White, 25.9% African American, 0.8% Native American, 14.3% Asian, 0.1% Pacific Islander, 5.4% from other races, and 4.4% from two or more races. Hispanic or Latino of any race were 9.6% of the population.

There were 10,756 households, of which 36.0% had children under the age of 18 living with them, 40.4% were married couples living together, 18.1% had a female householder with no husband present, 6.6% had a male householder with no wife present, and 34.8% were non-families. 27.7% of all households were made up of individuals, and 10.7% had someone living alone who was 65 years of age or older. The average household size was 2.78 and the average family size was 3.43.

The city's median age was 32.6. 27.6% of residents were under the age of 18; 10.1% were between the ages of 18 and 24; 28.1% were from 25 to 44; 22.1% were from 45 to 64; and 12.2% were 65 or older. The gender makeup was 48.7% male and 51.3% female.

2000 census
As of the census of 2000, 29,172 people, 11,430 households, and 7,383 families resided in the city. The city's racial makeup was 71.39% White, 14.09% African American, 0.87% Native American, 8.79% Asian, 0.01% Pacific Islander, 1.49% from other races, and 3.36% from two or more races. Hispanic or Latino of any race were 2.82% of the population.

There were 11,430 households, of which 29.7% had children under the age of 18 living with them, 46.3% were married couples living together, 13.4% had a female householder with no husband present, and 35.4% were non-families. 28.2% of all households were made up of individuals, and 11.0% had someone living alone who was 65 years of age or older. The average household size was 2.52 and the average family size was 3.11.

In the city, the population was spread out, with 25.1% under the age of 18, 9.6% from 18 to 24, 30.1% from 25 to 44, 19.8% from 45 to 64, and 15.4% who were 65 or older. The median age was 35. For every 100 females, there were 94.9 males.  For every 100 females age 18 and over, there were 91.8 males.

The city's median household income was $44,570, and the median family income was $52,006. Males had a median income of $36,031 versus $27,755 for females. The city's per capita income was $19,695. About 4.7% of families and 7.4% of the population were below the poverty line, including 10.7% of those under age 18 and 5.6% of those 65 or older.

Economy

When the Minnesota Educational Computing Consortium, also known as MECC, existed, its headquarters were in Brooklyn Center.

Brooklyn Center is home to regional favorite Surly Brewing Company.

Minnesota Martial Arts Academy, now known simply as the Academy, an MMA training center, is in Brooklyn Center. It has trained such notable fighters as Sean Sherk and Brock Lesnar.

Brooklyn Center is home to the FBI's new Minneapolis field office, which began construction in August 2010.

Top employers
According to Brooklyn Center's 2011 Comprehensive Annual Financial Report, the top employers in the city are:

Government
Brooklyn Center is in Minnesota's 5th congressional district.

Law enforcement
The Brooklyn Center Police Department was established in 1953, the city having previously had elected constables and appointed marshals. The department has about 47 sworn police officers; press reports indicate that none of them live in the city.

The department is organized into a number of divisions and units:
 Administration Division
 Community Services Division
Juvenile Crime Unit
Street Crimes Unit
 Investigations Division
Violent Offender's Task Force Officer
Auto Theft Prevention Officer
 Patrol Division
 Records & Property Division

Education
Globe University and Minnesota School of Business was a for-profit school network that Minnesota stopped from operating in the state in 2016, and of which all locations permanently closed by 2017 because it lost its federal student aid.

Notable people
 Dennie Gordon – TV/film director (Joe Dirt, What a Girl Wants, New York Minute)
 Marcus Harris – former college football player, and a Brooklyn Center High School alum, was an All-American wide receiver, played for the University of Wyoming, and won the 1996 Fred Biletnikoff Award as the best college wide receiver in the nation.
 Don Kramer – Minnesota state senator and businessman
 John Wingard - farmer and Minnesota state representative

References

Further reading
 A Church Grows in Brooklyn: A History of Two Hundred Years of Methodism in America, a History of the One Hundred Thirty Years of Brooklyn United Methodist Church. Brooklyn Center, Minn: Brooklyn United Methodist Church, 1984.
Hallberg, Jane, Leone Howe, and Mary J. Gustafson. History of the Earle Brown Farm. Brooklyn Center, Minn.: Brooklyn Historical Society, 1996.
Hoisington, Daniel John (2001). The Brooklyns: A history of Brooklyn Center and Brooklyn Park, Minnesota. Brooklyn Center Historical Society, .
Snodgrass, Pat. Brooklyn Park and Brooklyn Center. Chicago, IL: Arcadia Pub, 2009.

External links

 City of Brooklyn Center official website

Cities in Minnesota
Cities in Hennepin County, Minnesota
Minnesota populated places on the Mississippi River
Populated places established in 1852
1852 establishments in Minnesota Territory